Los Andes (i.e.: The Andes) is a department located in Salta Province, Argentina. It is the second largest by area in the province, after Rivadavia Department, and its capital is the town of San Antonio de los Cobres.

Geography

Overview
The department is located in the western area of the province, on the eastern side of the Andes, and includes the Puna de Atacama. It borders with Antofagasta Region (Chile), the provinces of Jujuy and Catamarca, and the departments of La Poma, Cachi and  Chicoana. The territorial strip linking the northern and southern side of La Poma Department separates Los Andes from Rosario de Lerma Department.

Places
Towns and municipalities:
 San Antonio de los Cobres (5,482 inh.)
 Mina La Casualidad (abandoned)
 Olacapato (186 inh.)
 Santa Rosa de los Pastos Grandes (136 inh.)
 Tolar Grande (119 inh.)

Other localities and places:
 Caipe
 Chuculaqui
 Laguna Seca
 Los Patos
 Mina Concordia
 Mina Tincalado
 Quebrada del Agua
 Salar de Pocitos
 Socompa
 Taca Taca
 Unquillal
 Vega de Arizaro

See also 
Tren a las Nubes
La Polvorilla
Salar de Arizaro
Salta–Antofagasta railway

References

External links 
 Los Andes Department on Salta Province website

Departments of Salta Province